The 34th New Zealand Parliament was a term of the New Zealand Parliament. It was elected at the 1963 general election on 30 November of that year.

1963 general election

The 1963 general election was held on Saturday, 30 November.

Sessions
The 34th Parliament sat for three sessions, and was prorogued on 21 October 1966.

Ministries
The second National Government remained in place until its defeat at the  towards the end of that year.

Overview of seats
The table below shows the number of MPs in each party following the 1963 election and at dissolution:

Notes
The Working Government majority is calculated as all Government MPs less all other parties.

Initial composition of the 34th Parliament

The 34th Parliament was the first term of parliament during which there were no by-elections held.

Notes

References

Sources

34